Postcards in the Sky is the sixth studio album by American singer David Archuleta. It is composed of sixteen tracks and is the first album by the singer to feature entirely original material since The Other Side of Down. Its lead single, "Numb", was released November 3, 2016. Earlier in release year, Archuleta released two extended plays that would build up to this album, Orion on May 19, with tracks "Numb", "Invincible", "Say Me", and "Up All Night", and Leo on August 25, with tracks "Other Things in Sight", "Someone to Love", "I'm Ready", and "Spotlight Down". The singles from this album were "Numb", "Up All Night", "Invincible", "Seasons", and the title track "Postcards in the Sky".

Information 
The album was released on October 20, 2017, independently under his own label Archie Music.

Track listing

Reception 
The album debuted at No. 43 on the Billboard Independent Albums chart and peaked at number 40.

Charts

References 

2017 albums
David Archuleta albums